Elections to Ashford Borough Council were held on 1 May 2003.  The whole council was up for election with boundary changes since the last election in 1999 reducing the number of seats by 6.  The Conservative Party gained control of the council from no overall control.

Election result

|}

Ward results

External links
 2003 Ashford election result

2003 English local elections
2003
2000s in Kent